Imam Prasodjo is an Indonesian social scientist and academic. He is currently a professor at the Department of Social and Political Science at the University of Indonesia. He earned his bachelor's degree from the University of Indonesia, his master's degree from Kansas State University, and his doctorate from Brown University.

Prasodjo has also been noted as a social activist. He has advocated for Indonesians to learn foreign languages despite fears that doing so would be unpatriotic, suggesting instead that Indonesia strives for more development in science and technology so other countries will also learn Indonesian. He was also responsible for social mapping of Jakarta's child-friendly integrated public spaces, publicly cautioning against former governor Basuki Tjahaja Purnama's restriction of local residents from participation in management decisions regarding the spaces.

References

1960 births
Brown University alumni
Indonesian sociologists
Kansas State University alumni
Living people
University of Indonesia alumni
Academic staff of the University of Indonesia